Jose Diaz may refer to:

Politics
 José Díaz (politician) (1895–1942), Spanish politician
 José Enrique Díaz Chávez (born 1932), Uruguayan politician, see List of Ministers of the Interior
 José Ramón Díaz (born 1973), Puerto Rican Senator
 José Félix Díaz (born 1980), Republican politician from Florida

Sports
 José Díaz (bobsleigh) (1907–1988), Mexican bobsledder
 José Díaz (footballer, born 1938), Argentine footballer
 José Antonio Díaz (fencer) (born 1938), Cuban fencer
 José Narciso Díaz (born 1950), Cuban Olympic fencer
 José Enrique Díaz (born 1953), Spanish football manager
 José Guadalupe Díaz (born 1954), Mexican football manager and former player
 José Díaz Pablo (born 1955), Spanish footballer
 José Díaz (weightlifter) (born 1959), Panamanian weightlifter
 José Díaz (rugby union) (born 1963), Spanish rugby union player
 Manolo Díaz (born 1968), Spanish football manager born José Manuel Díaz
 José Luis Díaz (footballer, born 1974), Argentinian footballer
 José Ignacio Díaz (born 1979), Spanish racewalker
 Joselo Díaz (born 1980), Major League Baseball player
 Jumbo Díaz (born 1984), Dominican baseball player
 José Daniel Díaz (born 1989), Venezuelan freestyle wrestler
 José Manuel Díaz (cyclist) (born 1995), Spanish cyclist
 José Díaz (weightlifter) (born 1959), Panamanian weightlifter

Other people
 José and Francisco Díaz (1777–1797), Puerto Rican soldiers who defended Puerto Rico against a British invasion in 1797
 José María Díaz (1813–1888), Spanish journalist and playwright
 José E. Díaz (1833–1867), Paraguayan general
 José Gallardo Díaz (1919–1942), victim of the Los Angeles Sleepy Lagoon murder
 José Pedro Díaz (1921–2006), Uruguayan essayist, educator and writer
 José Díaz-Balart (born 1960), American journalist
 Jose "Pepi" Diaz, American attorney and The Apprentice contestant
 Joey Diaz (born 1963), Cuban American stand-up comedian